Al-Saniya Sport Club is an Iraqi football team based in Al-Saniya, Al-Qādisiyyah, that plays in Iraq Division Three.

Managerial history
 Karim Al-Khazali
 Mustafa Jaber

See also 
 2021–22 Iraq Division Three

References

External links
 Iraq Clubs- Foundation Dates

2000 establishments in Iraq
Association football clubs established in 2000
Football clubs in Al-Qādisiyyah